Adria Airways d.o.o. (formerly Inex-Adria Aviopromet and later Inex-Adria Airways) was the flag carrier of Slovenia, operating scheduled and charter services to European destinations. The company's head office was at Ljubljana Jože Pučnik Airport in Zgornji Brnik, Cerklje na Gorenjskem, near Ljubljana. On 30 September 2019, the airline declared bankruptcy and ceased all operations.

History

1960s: Early years

The airline was founded in March 1961 as Adria Aviopromet (Adria Airways). In August the company purchased two DC-6B from KLM and flew their first commercial flight with a Dutch crew. At the same time, the first Adria crew and technical teams were trained by JAT Yugoslav Airlines and the air force. Adria carried out its first flight with a domestic crew in December 1961. At the same time all other activities necessary for the company were set up and organised, from the commercial to the accounting department.

During the following years, Adria gradually acquired a market with tourist flights from Germany, the United Kingdom, the Netherlands, and Scandinavia to airports on the Adriatic coast. In 1964, flights to the United States and Canada were added in order to meet the needs of expatriate organisations. Adria also carried out a considerable number of flights for the United Nations.

With the opening of the new airport in Ljubljana in 1964, Adria relocated its base from its previous headquarters in Zagreb.

The DC-6B aircraft gradually became non-competitive on the market. The company fell into a serious crisis in 1967, which ended with a bankruptcy procedure at 1968. After a compulsory settlement, Adria continued its operations largely thanks to the efforts of the president of the Slovenian Chamber of the Commerce and Industry of the time.

In December 1968, Adria merged with the Serbian company InterExport based in Belgrade and changed its name from Adria Aviopromet to Inex-Adria Aviopromet (Inex-Adria Airways). The fleet renewal began.

1970s: Jetliner introduction
In 1969, the first jet aircraft was purchased, a McDonnell Douglas DC-9-30 with 115 seats. Thus began a period of modernisation of the fleet, which allowed Adria to increase its share on the tourist flights market. In September 1969 the first scheduled service was established on the Ljubljana-Belgrade route. In March 1970, Adria had four Douglas DC-6B and a Douglas DC-9-30 with one more on order.

Business saw a considerable increase. Adria, in addition to expanding the number of its own aircraft, occasionally also leased aircraft (Sud Aviation Caravelle, Douglas DC-8, BAC One-Eleven).

In 1972, Adria renewed its transatlantic flights to the United States and Canada with Douglas DC-8-55 aircraft. However, it withdrew from that service next year.

In the late 1970s, Adria was awarded as most punctual carrier on the charter flight market. The greatest commercial successes of that period were achieved on the German market which was also the largest at that time, in a productive partnership with Grimex Company. The number of flights to Great Britain, France, Spain and Scandinavia also increased. During that period, Adria also introduced flights within Yugoslavia.

The company paid a great deal of attention to education. It founded a professional education centre and assisted in setting up an aviation course at the engineering faculty in Ljubljana. Special emphasis was given to the development of safety awareness, as three accidents occurred during the last decade.

1980s: Modernisation

Inex-Adria Aviopromet (Inex-Adria Airways) entered the 1980s as a respectable company with confirmed success on the tourist market and scheduled internal flights.
In May 1981 Adria purchased three new McDonnell Douglas MD-80 aircraft. Unfortunately, one of them crashed into a mountain in Corsica in December, killing all aboard.

In 1982, Adria got a new leadership which focused on the education of the flight crews, technical staff and other professional personnel as well as on ensuring safety.

In that period, the business remained focused on charter flights to the Adriatic. Flights for guest workers in Germany and Switzerland, which were connected to internal flights, became an important part of the business. At the end of 1984, the first scheduled international flights were also established on the Ljubljana–Belgrade–Larnaca route.

Prospects for the development of air traffic were very good, so in 1984, Adria signed a contract for the purchase of 5 Airbus A320 aircraft. Also two new Dash 7 aircraft were bought for the 1984 Winter Olympics in Sarajevo.

In December 1985, Adria had four McDonnell Douglas DC-9-30, two McDonnell Douglas DC-9-50, one McDonnell Douglas MD-81, three McDonnell Douglas MD-82 and two de Havilland Canada Dash 7 aircraft. A year later another MD-82 joined the fleet.

Due to a commercial law restructuring programme, in 1986, Adria left the Inex group, becoming an independent company and changing its name to Adria Airways. Later, Adria became a member of IATA.

In 1989, the first new Airbus A320 arrived. It was 43rd A320 made by the Airbus and the first one to be powered by the new IAE Engines.

1990s: Becoming a scheduled airline

As Yugoslavia began to break up, the tourist industry on the Adriatic slumped, which was also felt by air carriers.

In December 1990, a referendum on the independence of Slovenia was held, in which the overwhelming majority of Slovenian residents (around 89%) voted for independence. Independence was declared on 25 June 1991. Following that, Adria was facing an entirely new set of circumstances. On 28 June 1991, the Yugoslav Federal Air Force attacked Adria's hangar, causing serious damage to four aircraft, the building and various other vehicles. An Airbus A320, less than a year old, was heavily damaged and was flown to Toulouse later that year for almost a year of repairs. In addition, two Dash 7s and a DC-9-30 were damaged as well, while other planes escaped damage after being flown just hours earlier to the nearest airport of Klagenfurt. Adria was very handicapped that year because of insurance and registration issues. In 1991, Adria had 13 aircraft: three Airbus A320s (two were delivered in September 1990), four MD-82s, one MD-81, three DC-9-30s and two Dash 7s. Two A320s, expected to arrive in June 1991, were sold to other airlines.

Flights began in 1992, when Adria Airways re-established its activities on a truncated market. The majority of charter destinations from Western Europe to the Adriatic coast had become inaccessible as they were now situated on the territory of other countries. The fleet was too big, so many aircraft were leased out across the globe.

Adria Airways became Slovenia's national air carrier and its operational structure changed. From being largely a charter airline it transformed itself into a scheduled operator. Adria began to set up a network of scheduled flights around Europe to serve the needs of an independent Slovenia. Later in 1992, the company joined the Amadeus global travel distribution system. A period of restructuring and rehabilitation of the company began.

In the next years, Adria's A320s were mainly leased out, as well as MD-82s. An MD-81 and an MD-82 were sold in 1994. The other three MD-82 and a DC-9-30 were sold at the end of 1995. As part of an ownership restructuring, in February 1996, the Government of Slovenia obtained a 100% share in the company.

In 1996, in line with the administration's rescue programme, a rehabilitation procedure was started the aim of which was to enable the company to run on market principles. The main emphasis was on the rationalization and modernization of the operations and the adaptation of the fleet to market requirements. The number of employees has been reduced from 931 to 618. In 1996, the fleet consisted of three Airbus A320 with 168 seats (at least two were leased out most of the time), two DC-9-30 with 105 seats and two Dash-7 with 46 seats. Adria started a corporation with Lufthansa later in 1996.

In April 1997, Adria ordered two new Bombardier CRJ200LR planes with an option for one more. Planes were delivered in 1998 when two Dash-7 and two DC-9-30 left the fleet. Another CRJ200LR arrived in late 1998. Bombardier CRJ200LR were chosen as the best option for flights operated from Ljubljana, which allowed for more flights to be flown directly and more frequent. CRJ200LR are in 48 seats configuration which give space for a larger baggage compartment needed for charters. In 1999, Adria's fleet consisted of three Airbus A320, which were now operating back home, and three CRJ200LR.

In the late 1990s and early 2000s, the airline head office was in Ljubljana.

2000s: Getting on the new markets

Adria started to connect Balkan cities with Western Europe via its hub Ljubljana in the late 1990s. Cities like Sarajevo, Skopje, Ohrid, Tirana were connected with Scandinavia, UK, Germany and France. After the Kosovo War ended in 1999, Adria was the first airline fly to Pristina in the winter period of 1999. In March 2000, the 4th new 48 seats Bombardier CRJ200LR arrived.

Maribor, the second largest city in Slovenia was connected with Munich for a short period of time in the summer of 2000. There were 5 weekly flights around noon.

In 2001, Adria Airways recorded a large decrease in the number of annual passengers as a result of the September 11, 2001 attacks. In the winter of 2001, Adria started flying in the EU market, starting with the Vienna-Frankfurt route. In July 2002, Bombardier Aerospace selected Adria as the first authorised heavy maintenance facility for CRJ aircraft in Europe.

In the spring of 2003, Adria leased a Bombardier CRJ100LR with 50 seats from Bombardier; the lease lasted until January 2011. In August 2004, Adria was among the first airlines in the world to obtain an IOSA certificate. The 6th Bombardier CRJ200LR with 50 seats was leased from GECAS. On 18 November 2004, Adria Airways joined the Star Alliance.

In 2005, 7th brand new CRJ200LR with 50 seats was delivered to Adria. Adria ended with a loss of around €10 million and a new CEO was announced later in 2005. Tadej Tufek became the new CEO in 2006. Two Boeing 737-500 (112 seats) aircraft were leased from Ukraine International Airlines and Cirrus Airlines to fill the gap between the A320 (162 seats) and CRJ200 (48/50 seats). An A320 was leased to Afriqiyah Airways until late 2009 while another joined Afriqiyah in the winter of 2006 until the summer of 2008. In 2006, the company recorded a minimal profit and transported its first annual millionth passenger since the late 1980s.

In 2007, Adria ordered two Bombardier CRJ900 which were delivered in May. During the summer the fleet consisted of an Airbus A320 (162 seats), a Boeing 737-500 (112 seats) leased from Ukraine International Airlines, two Bombardier CRJ900LR (86 seats) and seven Bombardier CRJ200LR (48/50 seats) aircraft. In November 2007 Adria announced the purchase a new CRJ1000 NextGen and two new CRJ900 NextGen aircraft. Adria ended the year with a small profit.

In 2008, Adria converted its CRJ1000 NextGen order into a 5th CRJ900 and made a loss of €3 million again.

In March 2009, Adria Airways has signed a letter of intent with Airbus to purchase a new Airbus A319 aircraft. The management board planned to replace Airbus A320 fleet with new Airbus A319 aircraft. The seating configuration of the aircraft allows for 135 seats, which is economically efficient for the type of service operated by Adria Airways. Two Airbus A320 were sold to Myanmar Airways International in 2009, S5-AAC in October and S5-AAB in December. In November 2009 new headquarters at Ljubljana Airport were opened. A loss of €14 million was made in 2009.

2010s: Solving the crisis

Adria started a new decade with a huge accumulated loss. However, the future looked bright as two brand new Airbus A319s were planned to arrive in April 2010. In March 2010, Adria added Belgrade to its schedule, which was last operated prior to the disintegration of Yugoslavia. In April 2010, all operations were moved to Maribor, as Ljubljana airport was having its runway renovated. Later that month, Adria like many other airlines in Europe, was grounded due to the eruption of Eyjafjallajökull in Iceland.

Adria took delivery of two new Airbus A319s with a slight delay due to the volcanic eruption in April/May 2010.

In June 2010, as a part of reorganisation of the company, Adria Tehnika and Adria Flight School were created as separate companies.

New flights to Banja Luka started in July, which were operated in co-operation with Sky Srpska. Flights ended a year later. Later that month, flights to Marseille were started, offering Turkish truck drivers a connection from Istanbul via Ljubljana. These flights were cancelled at the end of 2011. In the summer of 2010 Adria's fleet consisted of an Airbus A320 (162 seats), two Airbus A319s (135 seats), four Bombardier CRJ900LR (86 seats) and seven Bombardier CRJ200LR (48/50 seats) aircraft. On 11 September 2010, Airbus A320-231 (S5-AAA), was retired and is stored at Ljubljana Airport. With the beginning of the winter timetable, flights from Marseille were moved to Toulon. From 10 December 2010, Adria started serving new routes from Pristina, Kosovo. Destinations during the winter were Düsseldorf, Frankfurt and Munich. During summer, Brussels, Copenhagen and Paris were added to those started in the winter season.

On 14 January 2011, CEO Tadej Tufek and Executive Director Marjan Ravnikar resigned because of bad results in their last years of leadership. Klemen Boštjančič became the new CEO, and a new Executive Director, Robert Vuga, was named. Adria sold its shares in Adria Tehnika to Ljubljana Airport and the Government to cover part of the loss.

In February 2011, CRJ100LR (S5-AAH) was retired and returned in August 2011 to Bombardier Capital. In March 2011, Adria celebrated its 50th anniversary. An exhibition in The National Museum of Contemporary History was made showing the history of Slovenian national carrier. As a part of immediate actions by the new management, two new Airbus aircraft were leased. An Airbus A320-231 (S5-AAS, ex EI-DOD) is leased from April 2011 for 3.5 years. It has 180 seats and is mostly operated on charter flights. At June, a second Airbus A320-211 (S5-AAT, ex CS-TNB) was supposed to be leased for 18 months but it was stored in October. It wore Adria retro colours from the 1960s. On 26 January 2012, S5-AAT was returned to the lessor GOAL which sold the aircraft.

In summer 2011, Adria operated with two Airbus A320s (180/162 seats), two Airbus A319s (135 seats), four Bombardier CRJ900 (86 seats) and 6 Bombardier CRJ200LR (50/48 seats). The 3rd Airbus A320 (S5-AAA) was still owned by Adria, but wasn't operational and was stored at Ljubljana airport.

A total loss of €63,073,630 was made in 2010. The majority of the loss was due to a revaluation of the fleet, which showed a decrease of €45,443,441 mainly because of poor market value for the CRJ200LR. Due to revaluation and accumulated losses, a financial restructuring plan was made in August. It involved the Government of Slovenia and the banks from which Adria had taken loans in the past years. According to the plan, the Government would invest €50 million and the banks would convert 25%-50% of the loans into equity. On 21 September 2011, Adria finalised the deal with the banks and the government. Together Adria got €69,720,983 - €50 million from the government, and the rest as converted through the loans-to-equity swap.

With the beginning of Winter 2011/12 timetable, Adria dropped flights to Banja Luka, London, Paris, Toulon and Warsaw. The Vienna-Frankfurt route was also cancelled.

For the 2012 summer season, Adria returned to three seasonal destinations: Barcelona, London Luton and Manchester.

In August 2012, Ljubljana Airport reported that it had a new airline to operate on a London-Luton route, and therefore Adria removed it from the winter and summer 2013 timetable.

On 24 September 2012, a leased Bomabrdier CRJ200LR registered S5-AAI was returned to lessor GECAS. Adria now operates five owned CRJ200LR planes and two owned CRJ900LR, two leased CRJ900LR (next gen) planes and two leased Airbus A319s along with a bigger leased Airbus A320 for a total of 12 planes.

For the 2012–13 winter season, the company operated nearly the same frequencies as in the last winter season and served the same destinations. The operational fleet was four CRJ900 and four CRJ200LR. The Airbus fleet operated on charters and would be leased out while the remaining CRJ200LR would be used on ad hoc charters (sport clubs, business/corporate, etc.) and as a back-up.

In spring of 2014, Adria began operating from Frankfurt to Tirana, Albania.

In summer of 2015, Adria began operating from Maribor to London Southend Airport, England. However, flights were terminated by the end of the season.

2016: Privatization of Adria Airways
In March 2016, 4K Invest, a Luxembourg-based restructuring fund, acquired 96% of Adria Airways' shares from the Slovene state. The new owner appointed Arno Schuster as the CEO of Adria.

On 1 July 2017, Adria suspended its base in the Polish city of Łódź, from which it held flights with its stationed CRJ700 aircraft, registered S5-AAZ, for the previous three years. During this time, Adria had also opened two other bases in Poland, one in Rzeszów and one in Olsztyn; however, both were terminated fairly quickly. Adria is now set to focus more on its main hub on Ljubljana Airport, which has already seen a boost in the frequencies of flights to a couple of destinations served by Adria. These destinations include Amsterdam, Podgorica, Pristina, Sarajevo and Skopje.

On 20 July 2017, Adria announced the purchase of Darwin Airline, which operated flights as Etihad Regional and was owned by Etihad Airways. The airline marketed itself as Adria Airways Switzerland, but continued its operations as Darwin Airline with the existing air operator's certificate (AOC). Adria was responsible for the marketing and some administrative and operational tasks. However, this did not directly impact the airline's operations as a whole, as the two bases remained in Geneva and Lugano.

In September 2017, it was revealed that Adria sold its brand for 8 million Euros to an undisclosed buyer in December of the previous year.

In November 2017, Adria announced new flights from the Swiss city of Bern, which came as a result of SkyWork Airlines, previously the largest operator out of Belp Airport, losing its AOC. The flights to Berlin, Hamburg, Munich and Vienna were set to begin on 6 November 2017, and were to be operated by the subsidiary Adria Airways Switzerland, however these plans were cancelled only days after the announcement, as SkyWork managed to regain its AOC.

In recent years, Adria has focused on ad hoc flights, which are mainly operated for large automotive companies, such as Ford, Chrysler and Ferrari.

On 12 December 2017, Adria's Swiss subsidiary Darwin Airline, which operated as Adria Airways Switzerland, was declared bankrupt and its AOC was revoked. The airline ended all operations.

2019: Final years
In January 2019, Adria Airways announced it would shut down its short-lived focus city operations at Paderborn Lippstadt Airport in Germany which consisted of three routes to London (which had already ceased in late 2018), Vienna and Zürich. At the same time, major cuts to the route network from the airline's home base in Ljubljana were announced, with all services to Brač, Bucharest, Dubrovnik, Düsseldorf, Geneva, Hamburg, Kyiv, Moscow and Warsaw being terminated.

On 20 September 2019, it was made public that two of the airline's Bombardier CRJ900 aircraft had been repossessed by their lessors over unpaid bills.

On 23 September 2019, Adria Airways announced on its web site that it would temporarily suspend flight operations for two days because it lacked the liquidity needed to maintain scheduled operations. The suspension was extended for two more days on 25 September. On the same day, it emerged that several of the carrier's aircraft had been repossessed by lessors due to non-payment of leasing contracts. On 26 September, the airline announced it would continue to operate flights between Ljubljana and Frankfurt. In a third delay announcement, on 27 September, the company said that it would continue to suspend service to all destinations except Frankfurt until the afternoon of Monday the 30th. Also on the 27 September, all three of the airline's Airbus A319-100s had been repossessed by their lessors.

On 30 September 2019, Adria Airways announced that it had officially filed for bankruptcy, ending 58 years of service. Accordingly, the company said that it would cancel all scheduled flights due to the initiation of bankruptcy proceedings. Slovenia's economic development minister Zdravko Počivalšek said that an option to set up a new airline within a few months in order to maintain important air links was being studied.

2020: Asset Auction

On 23 January 2020, Adria Airways assets were auctioned.  The winner was Izet Rastoder, a Montenegrin businessman that is known as the largest banana importer in Europe. His winning bid was 45,000 Euros.

Corporate affairs and identity

Headquarters

Adria's corporate headquarters were located on the grounds of Ljubljana Airport in Zgornji Brnik, Cerklje na Gorenjskem, Slovenia, near Ljubljana. In 2008 the first stone to the new Adria headquarters was laid. In November 2009 Adria moved in around 300 employees and all of its departments. The previous building, in the city of Ljubljana, was built in the 1980s. In the 1970s, Inex-Adria had its headquarters on the Ljubljana airport property like it did at the end of its operations.

Brand history
The Adria Airways visual identity was created in the late 1980s. The tail mark symbolized a linden tree leaf, a national symbol of Slovenia.

Financial and operational results

Subsidiaries
In addition to its main operation, Adria had several subsidiaries, including:
 Adria Airways Tehnika (not owned)
 Adria Flight Career Centre
 Amadeus Slovenia
 Adria Airways Kosovo

Adria Airways Tehnika 
Adria Airways Tehnika is a maintenance organization based at Ljubljana Airport. It is the line and base maintenance provider for Adria Airways also base maintenance is provided to Air Berlin, SAS Scandinavian Airlines, Air Méditerranée, Brit Air and many others. Before September 2002 sporadic third party maintenance was provided for some aircraft at the site. It was the first recognized service facility for the CRJ100/200/700/900 in Europe. In mid-2005 a partnership was formed with Air France Industries to perform A & C checks on aircraft of the A320 family. In 2010 Adria Airways Tehnika was established as a separate company, employing around 250 employees. With two hangars they can serve from two to five aircraft depending on their size. In 2015 Adria Airways Tehnika was privatized and sold to Czech-Polish Avia Prime Group, owner of Polish Linetech, and Serbian Jat Tehnika Maintenance Organisations. The name of the company was then rebranded to Adria Tehnika.

Adria Airways Switzerland 
Adria Airways Switzerland was the marketing name of Darwin Airline, which operated all of its flights, and was a Swiss subsidiary of Adria Airways. It was owned by Etihad Airways and branded as Etihad Regional, with bases at Geneva and Lugano in Switzerland. All flights by this unit ceased operations on 12 December 2017.

Destinations

As of Summer 2017, Adria Airways operated a main hub at Ljubljana Jože Pučnik Airport, as well as the secondary hub at Pristina International Airport Adem Jashari and Tirana International Airport Nënë Tereza. The majority of Adria Airways' business was in scheduled flights, but it also provided charter and ad hoc flights. As of July 2017, Adria operated to 24 scheduled and 22 charter destinations throughout Europe. Most of the flights were operated out of Ljubljana Jože Pučnik Airport, the airline's primary hub, but it also operates both scheduled and charter flights out of Pristina Airport and Tirana Airport. It had been a Star Alliance member since 2004 and a Lufthansa partner since 1996. The airline's scheduled charter flights were for the most part seasonal, and most frequently to holiday destinations in the Mediterranean region. Sharm el-Sheikh and Hurghada in Egypt were served all year round to a schedule.

Codeshare agreements
Adria Airways had codeshare agreements with the following airlines:

 Aeroflot
 Air Canada
 Air France
 Air India
 Air Serbia
 Austrian Airlines
 Brussels Airlines
 KLM
 LOT Polish Airlines
 Lufthansa
 Montenegro Airlines
 Scandinavian Airlines
 Singapore Airlines
 Swiss International Air Lines
 Turkish Airlines

Fleet

Final fleet

At the time of closure, Adria Airways' fleet comprised the following aircraft:

Former fleet
Adria Airways had formerly operated the following aircraft before it ceased operations:

Incidents and accidents
 30 October 1975: Inex-Adria Aviopromet Flight 450, a Douglas DC-9-32, hit high ground during an approach in fog near Prague-Suchdol, Czechoslovakia. The crash killed 75 of the 120 people on board.
 10 September 1976: an Inex-Adria Douglas DC-9-31 and a Hawker Siddeley Trident 3B of British Airways were involved in a mid-air collision over Zagreb, killing 176 people. The collision was attributed to an air traffic control error.
 1 December 1981: Inex-Adria Aviopromet Flight 1308, a McDonnell Douglas MD-81, crashed in the mountains while approaching Campo dell'Oro Airport in Ajaccio, Corsica. All 180 people on board were killed.

Annotations

References

External links

Defunct airlines of Slovenia
Airlines established in 1961
Airlines disestablished in 2019
Airlines of Yugoslavia
Slovenian brands
European Regions Airline Association
Association of European Airlines members
Former Star Alliance members
Government-owned airlines
1961 establishments in Yugoslavia
2019 disestablishments in Slovenia
Insolvent companies